ASIS Boats is a privately owned company that manufactures inflatable boats, RIBs and similar vessels. The company's headquarters are in Dubai, United Arab Emirates near the Jebel Ali industrial area. It also possesses an office and factory in Maryland, United States.

ASIS is one of the largest three manufacturers of RHIBS in the world. The company is completely vertically integrated.

History 
Roy Nouhra founded ASIS boats in 2005. He had been serving as Co-CEO of his family business Solico UAE. He founded the company using the already existing network of customers and suppliers. The company sold its first boat in 2006 and was established as an independent company.

In 2014, ASIS was given the licence to assemble the Sealegs Amphibious System on their boats, making them the first manufacturer outside New Zealand and Australia to use such technology. The company presented its first amphibious inboard RIB at the Dubai International Boat Show. The next year the company launched its first outboard amphibious boat at the Dubai International Boat Show. Three years later they decided to improve the existing amphibious boats and went on to develop their own 4WD amphibious system, the BAS 80-4.

Initially the company manufactured boats for leisure and recreational segments, and later began producing boats for commercial and military purposes as well.  As of 2016, ASIS has reduced its leisure division to 10% of the overall total, with greater focus on the professional and military segment.

Boats 
The company also provides training to their customers in piloting and maintaining the boats.

The company's RHIB Patrol and Rescue Boat was featured in Yacht Emirates Magazine in 2014, where the innovative design was highlighted.

Awards
ASIS was awarded the Business of The Year Award at the Gulf Capital SME Awards in 2015 and Nouhra was named Entrepreneur of The Year.

References

Inflatable boat manufacturers
Companies based in Dubai
Vehicle manufacturing companies established in 2005
2005 establishments in the United Arab Emirates